Vaucheria is a genus of Xanthophyceae or yellow-green algae known as water felt. It is one of only two genera in the family Vaucheriaceae. The type species of the genus is Vaucheria disperma.

The genus was circumscribed by Augustin Pyramus de Candolle in Bull. Sci. Soc. Philom. Paris vol.3 on page 20 in 1801.

The genus name of Vaucheria is in honour of Jean Pierre Étienne Vaucher (1763–1841), who was a Swiss Protestant pastor and botanist. 

Vaucheria exhibits apical growth from the tip of filaments forming mats in either terrestrial or freshwater environments.  Its filaments form coenocytes with a large central vacuole pushing against the surrounding cytoplasm; the vacuole extends along the entire filament except for the growing tip.  The chloroplasts are located on the periphery of the cytoplasm with the nuclei aggregating toward the center near the vacuole.

It has a hiplontic life cycle, previously thought to be diplontic.

Species
As accepted by WoRMS;

Vaucheria acrandra 
Vaucheria adela 
Vaucheria adunca 
Vaucheria aestuarii 
Vaucheria alaskana 
Vaucheria amphibia 
Vaucheria antarctica 
Vaucheria arcassonensis 
Vaucheria arechavaletae 
Vaucheria aversa 
Vaucheria bermudensis 
Vaucheria bicornigera 
Vaucheria bilateralis 
Vaucheria birostris 
Vaucheria borealis Hirn, 1900
Vaucheria bursata 
Vaucheria caloundrensis 
Vaucheria canalicularis 
Vaucheria compacta 
Vaucheria conifera 
Vaucheria coronata 
Vaucheria crenulata 
Vaucheria cruciata 
Vaucheria dichotoma 
Vaucheria dillwynii 
Vaucheria discoidea 
Vaucheria edaphica 
Vaucheria erythrospora 
Vaucheria folliculata 
Vaucheria fontinalis 
Vaucheria frigida 
Vaucheria gardneri 
Vaucheria geminata (Vaucher) De Candolle, 1805
Vaucheria glomerata 
Vaucheria gyrogyna 
Vaucheria hamata 
Vaucheria hercyniana Rieth, 1974
Vaucheria hookeri 
Vaucheria incurva 
Vaucheria intermedia 
Vaucheria jaoi 
Vaucheria javanica 
Vaucheria jonesii 
Vaucheria karachiensis 
Vaucheria karnaphulii 
Vaucheria leyana 
Vaucheria lii 
Vaucheria litorea C.Agardh, 1823
Vaucheria longata 
Vaucheria longicaulis 
Vaucheria longipes 
Vaucheria madhuensis 
Vaucheria mayyanadensis 
Vaucheria medusa 
Vaucheria megaspora 
Vaucheria micranthera 
Vaucheria minuta 
Vaucheria mulleola 
Vaucheria nanandra 
Vaucheria nasuta 
Vaucheria orientalis 
Vaucheria orthocarpa 
Vaucheria patagonica 
Vaucheria piloboloides 
Vaucheria polymorpha 
Vaucheria prasadense 
Vaucheria prescottii 
Vaucheria prolifera 
Vaucheria prona 
Vaucheria pronosperma 
Vaucheria pseudogeminata 
Vaucheria pseudomonoica 
Vaucheria racemosa 
Vaucheria randhawae 
Vaucheria schleicheri 
Vaucheria sescuplicaria  
Vaucheria sessilis (Vaucher) De Candolle, 1805
Vaucheria simplex 
Vaucheria subarechavaletae 
Vaucheria submarina 
Vaucheria subsimplex 
Vaucheria synandra 
Vaucheria taylorii 
Vaucheria terrestris (Vaucher) De Candolle, 1805
Vaucheria uncinata 
Vaucheria undulata 
Vaucheria velutina 
Vaucheria venkataramanii 
Vaucheria verticillata 
Vaucheria vipera 
Vaucheria walzii 
Vaucheria woroniniana 
Vaucheria zapotecana

References

Heterokont genera
Xanthophyceae